Sergio Staino (born 8 June 1940) is an Italian comics author, satirist and film director.

Biography
Staino was born at Piancastagnaio, in the province of Siena. After graduating in architecture, he moved to Scandicci. His comics debut was with Bobo, an autobiographical character, published in the magazine Linus starting from 1979.

In the 1980s he collaborated with the newspapers Il Messaggero and L'Unità, for which he still works. In 1986 he founded the satirical magazine Tango. From 1987 to 1993, he also directed satirical TV shows for Rai 3, such as Teletango and Cielito Lindo; in this period he also directed two movies, Cavalli si nasce (1989) and Non chiamarmi Omar (1992).

Staino is a member of the Union of Rationalist Atheists and Agnostics.

In 2016 he published his autobiography Io sono Bobo (Della Porta) written with journalists Fabio Galati and Laura Montanari. On 8 September of the same year he becomes the new editor of L'Unità.

References

External links
Official website 
Lambiek Comiclopedia article.

1940 births
Living people
People from the Province of Siena
Italian comics artists
Italian film directors
Italian comics writers
Italian magazine editors
Italian magazine founders
Italian newspaper editors
Italian cartoonists
Italian satirists
L'Unità editors